Sevendust is an American rock band from Atlanta, Georgia, formed in 1994 by bassist Vince Hornsby, drummer Morgan Rose and rhythm guitarist John Connolly. After their first demo, lead vocalist Lajon Witherspoon and lead guitarist Clint Lowery joined the group. Following a few name changes, the members settled on the name Sevendust and released their self-titled debut album on April 15, 1997, which sold only 310 copies in its first week but ultimately achieved gold certification through touring and support from their label, TVT Records.

Since formation, Sevendust have attained success with three consecutive RIAA gold-certified albums, a Grammy nomination, and have sold millions of records worldwide. The group has released a total of thirteen studio albums, including a reissue of their debut as Sevendust: Definitive Edition, which contains five new tracks and a DVD.

History

Early years and Sevendust (1994–1998)

In 1994, bassist Vince Hornsby joined drummer Morgan Rose in a band called Snake Nation. John Connolly, a drummer at the time, joined the group as guitarist. They recorded their first demo, but were displeased with the lead vocals and hired Lajon Witherspoon following a yearlong search. Around the same time, guitarist Lee Banks joined to complete the lineup, and the group renamed themselves Rumblefish. Shortly after, Banks became dissatisfied with the touring schedule. The band subsequently replaced him with Clint Lowery.

Rumblefish were forced to rename themselves after discovering another band with the same name. They chose Crawlspace, and released "My Ruin" on the 1996 compilation album Mortal Kombat: More Kombat through TVT Records. However, the band had to change their name again after another group named Crawlspace sent notice that they wanted $2,500 in exchange for the naming rights. The band members elected to rename themselves Sevendust, inspired by the commercial insecticide brand "Sevin Dust". The song "Rumble Fish" was included on the band's second album, Home.

Sevendust released their self-titled debut, with partial production by former Twisted Sister guitarist Jay Jay French, on April 15, 1997, known for its heavy riffs, angry vocals and thrash-like drumming, as in the songs "Black" and "Bitch". "Black" became the opening song for nearly every Sevendust concert until 2004. The debut album also contains the song "My Ruin", from the Mortal Kombat soundtrack. Sevendust appeared on the Billboard 200, remained there for sixteen weeks and peaked at 165 on April 4, 1998. The album went gold on May 19, 1999.

In 1998, Sevendust performed at Dynamo Open Air (May 29–31) and Ozzfest 1998 (July through August). In the same year they released a compilation called Live and Loud which featured live footage of the band's performance of September 16, 1998, at Chicago's Metro.

Home and Animosity (1999–2002)
On August 24, 1999, they released their second album, Home. The album peaked at 19 on the Billboard 200 and featured Skin from Skunk Anansie and Chino Moreno from Deftones as guest vocalists. The two singles from the album, "Denial" and "Waffle", gave the band moderate chart success, and the latter of which was played on the Late Night with Conan O'Brien show. They appeared in Woodstock 1999 and have toured with many bands such as Korn, Staind, Nonpoint, Reveille, Godsmack, Mudvayne, Mushroomhead, Powerman 5000, Creed, Kid Rock, Machine Head, Limp Bizkit, Disturbed, and Metallica. In 1999, they gained European exposure by opening for Skunk Anansie at various shows in Germany. Skin from Skunk Anansie provided guest vocals on the track "Licking Cream" off Home. They also opened with Kid Rock and Ted Nugent for Metallica on New Year's Eve in 1999 at the Pontiac Silverdome near Detroit, Michigan. They also joined Slipknot, Coal Chamber and other bands on the Tattoo the Earth Tour in June 2000. Also in 2000, the song "Fall" was recorded by producer Sylvia Massy in 1998 at Southern Tracks in Atlanta, Georgia. "Fall" appears on the soundtrack to the film Scream 3.

In November 2001, the band released their third album, Animosity. This album went gold and gained the band commercial success thanks to the success of singles "Praise" and "Angel's Son", which peaked at 15 and 11, respectively, on the Mainstream Rock Tracks. In 2002, they covered "Break the Walls Down", the theme song for professional wrestler Chris Jericho for the WWF Forceable Entry album. The song was never used as an official entry theme for him though. "Angel's Son" was a tribute to Lynn Strait, the lead singer of the band Snot, whom the members of Sevendust were friends with. Strait had died in a car accident in 1998. In addition to being included on Animosity, the song was included on the compilation album Strait Up. The band made an appearance on the Late Show with David Letterman playing an acoustic version of "Angel's Son" featuring Paul Shaffer on keyboards.

In the same year Sevendust was seen in the Chris Rock movie Down to Earth as a partial clip of "Waffle" is played.

Another friend of the band, Dave Williams, the lead singer of Drowning Pool, died in 2002. Tragedy would strike again when Lajon Witherspoon's younger brother was shot and killed later that year. Due to his death, Sevendust went on hiatus in 2002.

Seasons, Clint Lowery's departure and Next (2003–2005) 
In 2003, Sevendust returned with their fourth album, Seasons. The album debuted at No. 14 in the US, selling around 68,000 copies in its first week. This was one of the band's best received albums and to date features their highest charting single (tied with "Driven"), "Enemy", which peaked at No. 10 on the Mainstream Rock Chart. "Enemy" was made the official theme song for WWE Unforgiven 2003. Other singles released from the album, "Broken Down" and "Face to Face", met with more moderate success charting at 20 and 22, respectively.

In 2004, for the first time in the band's career, they released a live album on a CD/DVD double disk package titled Southside Double-Wide: Acoustic Live. Both the CD and the DVD include a cover of "Hurt" by Nine Inch Nails which is dedicated to Johnny Cash. This concert showcased a mellower side to the band with an acoustic performance.

On December 11, 2004, after playing a show in Columbus, Ohio, it was announced that Clint Lowery had left the band mid-tour, because he wanted to play with his brother Corey Lowery in his new band Dark New Day, who had reportedly just signed with Warner Bros. Records. A temporary guitarist was found for the rest of the dates, and Lowery was eventually replaced by Sonny Mayo (from Snot and Amen). At roughly the same time, Sevendust and TVT Records parted ways.

On October 11, 2005, Sevendust joined forces with good friend Producer/Engineer Shawn Grove and released their fifth studio album, Next, on the WineDark Records label, distributed by Universal Music. In the process, Sevendust also created their own record label, 7Bros Records. The album was actually recorded in a private house-turned-studio owned by a couple outside of the band's hometown of Atlanta, Georgia, where Creed had recorded the Weathered record. The first radio single off "Next" was the track "Ugly", released to radio August 9, 2005, followed by the music video. The track "Pieces" appeared on the soundtrack for the film Saw II. Next debuted at No. 20 in the US, selling around 37,000 copies in its first week. Not much longer after the release of Next, Sevendust's former label TVT Records released a greatest hits package for Sevendust, titled Best of (Chapter One 1997–2004), the label's final Sevendust release.

A few months after the October 2005 release date of Next, though, it became clear that WineDark would not live up to the band's expectations. "I had people come up to me and say, 'When is the record coming out?' And it had already been out for five months", Rose grumbles. "Basically, the main person that was in charge of the whole thing fell off the face of the earth. There were no more cheques coming in, and the money had not been paid in full."

Alpha, Chapter VII: Hope & Sorrow and Clint Lowery's return (2006–2008) 
In early 2006, the band themselves were considered bankrupt. WineDark Records had imploded, leaving them without distribution, tour support, or promised advance payments. The band owed money to crew members and other staffers and had a mounting credit card debt. In April, they expected that a tax refund from the US government would help ease the burden. Then, they found out their accountant hadn't paid their taxes and they owed $120,000 to the government. "We were beyond broke", says drummer and lyricist Morgan Rose. "We had a debt load close to a million dollars, and we were in a position where, no matter how much money we thought we were making, we were still having to pay and pay."

Sevendust (with Shawn Grove again serving as producer and engineer), released their sixth full-length studio album, entitled Alpha, on March 6, 2007. The album debuted at No. 14 in the US, the band's highest chart position yet, selling over 42,000 copies of the album in its first week of sale. The disc contained the album's preceding internet track "Deathstar", the Hot Mainstream Rock top 10 smash "Driven" and a further Active Rock radio top 40 hit in the form of "Beg to Differ". Alpha is the band's second album featuring Sonny Mayo on rhythm guitar and the first with him as part of the writing process. Alpha is also the first album by the band to be released under the Warner-affiliated Asylum Records, making Sevendust the first rock band on that label. The band also headlined a 57-date tour from February 8, 2007, to April 28, 2007. Boston heavy metal band Diecast, supergroup Invitro, and modern rock Red accompanied Sevendust on the tour.

Retrospective 2, a CD/DVD combo including two previously unreleased studio tracks, live concert footage never before seen, as well as the new music videos for the songs "Beg To Differ", "Ugly", "Pieces", and "Driven", was released on December 11, 2007. The song "The Rim" was released on the Alpha CD but only sold in Target retails stores as exclusive 13th track on the Alpha CD. "Feed" and "Driven" were used in the soundtrack to WWE SmackDown vs. Raw 2008.

Sevendust joined Shawn Grove again, and returned to the studio at the end of November 2007 to finish their 7th studio album, titled Chapter VII: Hope & Sorrow. The record was originally slated for a release of March 4, 2008, but was later pushed back to April 1. The album debuted at No. 19 on the Billboard 200 and has appearances from Daughtry frontman Chris Daughtry, Alter Bridge members Myles Kennedy and Mark Tremonti. The first single from Chapter VII was "Prodigal Son", which peaked at No. 19 on the mainstream rock chart. The second single was "The Past" and the third "Inside."
On March 26, 2008, Sevendust announced that Lowery had quit his duties as guitarist for Dark New Day and would be returning to the Sevendust lineup in place of Mayo. On Lowery's return, Rose stated "This was extremely tough considering Sonny is our brother and has been amazing to work with. [Sonny] didn't do anything wrong at all; we just owe it to ourselves and all the folks that grew up with us to put our original band back together."

Cold Day Memory (2009–2011) 
In December 2008 Sevendust toured with Black Stone Cherry for a while and then in January 2009, Sevendust geared up to hit the road with Disturbed, as well as multiple shows for US troops in Iraq and Afghanistan in the spring. Sevendust released a very limited-edition box set in November 2008 entitled Packaged Goods. Each five-disc set is personally autographed by the entire band. The box set includes Sevendust's 2005 release Next, 2007's Alpha, 2007's Retrospective 2 (CD + DVD), and 2008's Chapter VII: Hope and Sorrow. Before heading into the studio to record their 8th studio album, the band headlined the End of Summer Scorcher held & sponsored by 98KUPD in Phoenix, Arizona on September 26, 2009. Along with Sevendust, other notable acts such as Corey Taylor, Five Finger Death Punch, Shadows Fall & Otep performed as well.

October 2009, Sevendust started recording Cold Day Memory in Chicago with producer Johnny K, who has produced other successful rock acts such as Disturbed, Staind, Finger Eleven, and 3 Doors Down. The band launched a newly designed website, promoting the new album. During the recording process the band posted daily videos on their official site and their YouTube channel; with updates on the new album, recording sessions in the studio and recording sessions from their new house. Stepping out of the box from regular recording sessions, they are showing the fans how the album process is done, and every step in the intricate process. On February 6, 2010, the band leaked the song "Forever Dead" on their website. Also "Unraveling" was released through iTunes on March 2. On March 17, the band streamed "Last Breath" on the radio. The following day, "Confessions (Without Faith)" received play time on the radio, as did "The End is Coming." The band released its eighth album, Cold Day Memory, on April 20, 2010; the 12-song disc marked Sevendust's first studio recording with the band's original line-up since 2003's Seasons. The first official single, "Unraveling", hit No. 29 on The Rock Songs chart while the CD rocketed to No. 12 on The Billboard 200. The album includes two more singles, "Forever" and "Last Breath", both of which were welcomed by Active Rock radio.

Sevendust toured with Chevelle, Shinedown, Puddle of Mudd, and 10 Years on the Carnival of Madness during the summer of 2010. The band also re-released their self-titled debut album called Sevendust: Definitive Edition. The re-release contains five new songs. In November 2010, it was announced that Sevendust would play alongside Disturbed, Korn and In This Moment in the "Music As A Weapon 5" tour. In February and March 2011, Sevendust toured in Australia with Iron Maiden, Slayer, Ill Niño and Stone Sour for the Soundwave Festival On October 16, 2011, the band headlined the second stage on the second day of the inaugural 48 Hours Festival in Las Vegas, Nevada.

Black Out the Sun and Time Travelers & Bonfires (2012–2014)
On June 27, 2012, Sevendust announced that they would enter the studio for their next album on September 5, 2012. They entered Architekt Music studios in Butler, New Jersey with engineer Mike Ferretti. Sevendust has completed recording its ninth album for an early 2013 release. In October 2012 interview, Lowery described the album as "...a basic Sevendust record", stating "There's nothing, like, too completely different than anything we've done before. It's got a darker vibe to it. We've got a good amount of the programming element in there. It's a lot of what we do. it's heavy and it's got its melodic element in it". Additionally, he discussed the possibility of touring in early 2013 with Lacuna Coil.
Lowery later confirmed the album's title to be Black Out the Sun as well. Sevendust announced they will release the album on their own 7Bros. Records label (through Warner Music Group's Independent Label Group) on March 26, 2013. The album's debut single, "Decay" was released to radio and retail outlets on January 22, 2013. Sevendust and Coal Chamber have announced a co-headlining tour around the United States that begins on March 28 and runs through April 28, 2013.

Black Out The Sun is Sevendust's first album to score No. 1 on the Billboard charts, landing number one on the "Top Hard Music Albums" in the first week of its release and is the band's best selling album in its first week of release since 2007's Alpha. Sevendust later released another single, "Picture Perfect", to rock radio stations.

The band recorded an acoustic album in early 2014 and will support the album with an acoustic tour. The album was recorded at Architekt Music in Butler, NJ, the same studio where the band's 2013 album Black Out the Sun was recorded. The record, called Time Travelers & Bonfires, was released on April 15, on 7Bros. Records, in conjunction with ADA Label Services. On April 1, the band hit the road for their first U.S. headlining tour of the year, entitled "An Evening With Sevendust." The album's first single is the acoustic version of Black (acoustic) which was added on radio stations on March 25, 2014. The album sold around 15,000 copies in the United States in its first week of release to debut at position No. 19 on The Billboard 200 chart.

In an April 13, conversation with Metalholic.com, guitarist Clint Lowery said the band hopes to record another acoustic album in about two years and wants to make it part of the Sevendust cycle. He also shared that the band plans to release a live DVD with both standard and acoustic concerts as well as a historical retrospective of the band for an early 2015 release. Guitarist John Connolly confirmed on his Facebook page that the live DVD recording was on hiatus due to business decisions and would likely be something the band would still pursue.

Kill the Flaw (2015–2017)
In February 2015, Sevendust entered the studio to begin recording their new album. It was  reported that the band had finished recording their new album in late March 2015. Sevendust  titled the new record Kill the Flaw which was self-produced and recorded at Architekt Music studio in Butler, New Jersey and was released on October 2, 2015, via 7Bros. Records with ADA/Warner Brothers distribution. The album debuted at No. 13 on the Billboard 200 Chart, selling over 21,000 units in the first week of release. On July 24 the band released their new single "Thank You" to various rock radio stations around the US, with its official release of July 27. Sevendust also announced as direct support on the upcoming Godsmack tour, which began on September 23, 2015. The band released lyric video for the song "Not Today" from the album on August 28. Sevendust traveled to Australia and New Zealand in March 2016. The tour marked the band's first trip down under in six years after their slated 2014 Soundwave Festival appearance was controversially cancelled. The band suffered considerable backlash from Australian fans who lay the blame on the band for the last minute cancellation. The song "Thank You" was nominated for Best Metal Performance for the 2016 Grammy Awards. On January 27, 2016, the band announced a U.S. headliner tour with Trivium and Like a Storm as direct support.  Sevendust would also embark on another headlining tour of North America including Canadian dates in August.

Sevendust released the Live in Denver acoustic set on DVD on December 14, 2016.

All I See Is War (2017–2019)
On March 1, 2017, Sevendust announced that they were writing and demoing for a new album.

On July 6, 2017, guitarist John Connolly posted a live video on the Sevendust Facebook page stating that the band would go into the studio in November 2017 with producer Michael Baskette, with a tentative release in the spring of 2018. Additionally he announced that the band had signed a deal with Rise Records.

On a podcast, drummer Morgan Rose revealed the name of their 2018 release as All I See Is War. The album was released on May 11, 2018.

Sevendust announced that the first single, "Dirty", was premiering on Sirius XM Octane, March 14, 2018.

On April 20, 2018, the band began a headlining tour in support of the album.

Blood & Stone (2020–present)
Blood & Stone was released on October 23, 2020, through Rise Records. The first song to be released off the album, "The Day I Tried to Live", is a tribute to the late singer Chris Cornell's band Soundgarden. It was released on June 26, 2020.

Musical style and influences

Sevendust has played genres like heavy metal, alternative metal, nu metal, hard rock, industrial metal, and post-grunge. Guitarist John Connolly was asked what the band defined their genre as. Connolly said: "I don't know. I've been trying to figure that out. It was back in the day. People, for five minutes called us progressive, and then it was nu-metal. Then, all of a sudden, we were playing alternative metal. We are some kind of heavy and some kind of rock and some kind of metal."

According to AllMusic, Sevendust became one of the rising acts in late 1990s heavy metal with an aggressive blend of bottom-heavy riffs and soulful, accessible melodies. The band's lead singer, Lajon Witherspoon, has been praised for his soulful vocals. Mark Jenkins of Washington Post states, "Witherspoon is more flexible than most heavy-rock vocalists, capable of lilting as convincingly as he growls." Ultimate Guitar mentioned, "He has a fairly distinct voice for metal, which originally helped the band stand out". A major part of the Sevendust sound has always been guitar player Clint Lowery. He is the main contributor to the band's style and sound and is known for his raw melodies and empowering riffs. Lowery incorporates ultra-low baritone tunings, and creative 6-string tunings. Sevendust's influences include Metallica, Anthrax, Testament, Ozzy Osbourne, Pantera, Van Halen, Steve Vai, Iron Maiden, Ronnie James Dio, Nine Inch Nails, and Suicidal Tendencies. Frontman Lajon Witherspoon said he is influenced by "so many" genres of music, "from R&B, to rock, to jazz, and classical." Witherspoon then said he is "influenced by everything."

Other projects
Clint Lowery and Morgan Rose started a separate band called Call Me No One. They released an album, Last Parade released on June 5, 2012 and have publicly stated that the band will not continue on. John Connolly and bassist Vinnie Hornsby have joined forces with Alter Bridge and Creed drummer Scott Phillips and former Submersed guitarist Eric Friedman to form a separate band called Projected. They released their debut album, Human, on September 18, 2012, and a follow-up album, Ignite My Insanity, July 21, 2017. Rose released an EP for his solo project in 2020.

Other appearances

On September 16, 2010, Sevendust filmed a video for "Falcons on Top", the official theme song of the Atlanta Falcons football team. Written by Joel Wanasek of JTW Studios. The video shoot took place at the Georgia Dome in Atlanta and included an appearance by the Atlanta Falcons cheerleaders.

Band members
Current members
Vince Hornsby – bass (1994–present), backing vocals (2014–present)
Morgan Rose – drums, backing vocals (1994–present), lead vocals (1994)
John Connolly – rhythm guitar (1994–2005, 2008–present), lead guitar (1994, 2004–2008), backing vocals (1994–present)
Lajon Witherspoon – lead vocals (1994–present)
Clint Lowery – lead guitar, backing vocals (1995–2004, 2008–present)

Former members
Sonny Mayo – rhythm guitar (2005–2008)
Lee Banks – lead guitar (1994–1995)

Timeline

Discography

Studio albums
 Sevendust (1997)
 Home (1999)
 Animosity (2001)
 Seasons (2003)
 Next (2005)
 Alpha (2007)
 Chapter VII: Hope & Sorrow (2008)
 Cold Day Memory (2010)
 Black Out the Sun (2013)
 Time Travelers & Bonfires (2014)
 Kill the Flaw (2015)
 All I See Is War (2018)
 Blood & Stone (2020)

References

External links
 

 
1994 establishments in Georgia (U.S. state)
American alternative metal musical groups
American nu metal musical groups
Asylum Records artists
Heavy metal musical groups from Georgia (U.S. state)
American hard rock musical groups
Musical groups established in 1994
Musical groups from Atlanta
Musical quintets
Roadrunner Records artists
Rise Records artists
TVT Records artists
Warner Music Group artists